William Gibbes (died May 1689) was an English merchant and politician who sat in the House of Commons between 1654 and 1656.

Gibbes was a London merchant and a member of the Worshipful Company of Goldsmiths. He was elected alderman of the CIty of London for Farringdon Without ward on 26 August 1642. He was Prime Warden of the Goldsmiths Company from 1643 to 1644 and Sheriff of London from 1644 to 1655.

In 1654, Gibbes was elected Member of Parliament for Suffolk in the Short Parliament. He was re-elected MP for Suffolk in 1656. 
 
Gibbes lived at Stoke-by-Nayland. In 1677 he was High Sheriff of Suffolk.

References

Year of birth missing
1689 deaths
English MPs 1654–1655
English merchants
17th-century merchants
17th-century English businesspeople